Seward High School can refer to:

Seward High School (Alaska) in Seward, Alaska
Seward High School (Nebraska) in Seward, Nebraska